Managobinda Samal (1921-2003) was a politician and social activist born on 5 September 1921 at Kalashree Gopalpur, Jajpur, Odisha, India. He was elected twice as a Member of Legislative Assembly, Odisha from Barachana (Odisha Vidhan Sabha constituency).

Early life
Managobinda Samal was educated at Salipur School, Cuttack District, Odisha. After school he was doing job at Kolkata. He joined Oriya Union at Kolkata. He came to odisha politics under the guidance of Nabakrushna Choudhuri.

Entry into politics
Firstly Mana Babu was elected as Sarpanch of Kalashree Gopalpur Gram panchayat. He was also elected as Barchana Block Chairman. He contested from Barachana Vidhan Sabha Constituency as a Member of the Legislative Assembly from 1971 to 1985. He was elected twice as a Member of the Legislative Assembly from Barachana Vidhan Sabha Constituency.

Organisations founded by Managobinda Samal
Mana Babu was a well known person for founding different schools, colleges & hospitals in Barachana Block. He gave employment to many people of Barachana Vidhan Sabha Constituency.

Below are the organisations founded by Mana Babu.
 Sahaspur College, Balichandrapur, Jajpur, Odisha
 Gopalpur Medical, Khadagpur, Jajpur, Odisha
 Balichandrapur High School, Jajpur, Odisha
 Barachana Girls High School, Jajpur, Odisha
 Kalashree U.G.M.E. School, Jajpur, Odisha
 Gajendrapur Veterinary Medical, Jajpur, Odisha

References

External links
 https://web.archive.org/web/20131217121136/http://orissa.gov.in/e-magazine/orissaannualreference/ORA-2011/pdf/453-501.pdf
 Key Highlightsofgeneral Election, 1971
 Key Highlightsofgeneral Election, 1974
 Key Highlightsofgeneral Election, 1977
 Statistical report on General Election, 1980
 Statistical report on General Election, 1985
 Orissa Assembly Election 1985
 Orissa Assembly Election 1980
 Orissa Assembly Election 1977
 
 
 
 

1921 births
2003 deaths
People from Jajpur district
Janata Dal politicians
Members of the Odisha Legislative Assembly
Utkal Congress politicians
Janata Party politicians
Socialist Unity Centre of India (Communist) politicians